The 2019–20 California United Strikers FC season was the club's inaugural season in the National Independent Soccer Association, a newly established third division soccer league in the United States.

Overview
Since 2017, Cal United had attempted to join two professional leagues, the North American Soccer League and National Premier Soccer League's proposed professional league (beginning with the NPSL Founders Cup tournament), with neither effort taking form. In June 2019 the team was accepted into NISA as a member for the league's inaugural season.

The Strikers finished the fall season in second place with a 2-3-1 (9 pts) record, clinching a spot in the West Coast Championship against LA Force. In the final, which was played at Championship Stadium with Cal being designated the "away" team due to seeding, the Strikers beat LA in a penalty kick shootout and won its first professional trophy.

In early July 2019, prior to the NISA season kicking off, the team beat 30-time Liga Nacional de Fútbol de Guatemala champions C.S.D. Municipal, 3–1, in the latter's pre-season tour of the United States.

On April 27, 2020, following a stoppage of play and subsequent extension due to the COVID-19 pandemic, NISA announced the cancellation of the 2020 Spring season.

Players

Staff
  Don Ebert – Head coach
  Roy Chingirian – Assistant coach

Transfers

In

Out

Friendlies

Competitions

NISA Fall season (Showcase)

Details for the 2019 NISA Fall season were announced July 25, 2019.

Standings

Results summary

Matches

Fall Playoff

NISA Spring Season 

Details for the 2020 NISA Spring season were announced January 27, 2020.

Standings

Results summary

Matches

U.S. Open Cup 

Cal United will enter the 2020 U.S. Open Cup with the rest of the National Independent Soccer Association teams in the Second Round. It was announced on January 29 that their first opponent would be USL Championship side Orange County SC.

Squad statistics

Appearances and goals 

|-
! colspan="16" style="background:#dcdcdc; text-align:center"| Goalkeepers

|-
! colspan="16" style="background:#dcdcdc; text-align:center"| Defenders

|-
! colspan="16" style="background:#dcdcdc; text-align:center"| Midfielders

|-
! colspan="16" style="background:#dcdcdc; text-align:center"| Forwards

|-
! colspan="16" style="background:#dcdcdc; text-align:center"| Left during season

|-
|}

Goal scorers

Disciplinary record

References

External links 
 

2019
American soccer clubs 2019 season
American soccer clubs 2020 season
2019 in sports in California
2020 in sports in California